Roy Assaf (born 1982 in Sde Moshe) is an Israeli dancer and choreographer.

Biography 
After working with Emanuel Gat from 2003 to 2009 he started developing his own choreographies in 2010. He made his New York debut in 2017 at Baryshnikov Arts Center.

References

External links

1982 births
Living people
Modern dancers
Israeli Jews
Israeli male dancers
Israeli choreographers
Date of birth missing (living people)